Nanodectes bulbicercus is a species of insect in family Tettigoniidae. It is endemic to Australia.

Sources

Tettigoniidae
Orthoptera of Australia
Critically endangered fauna of Australia
Critically endangered insects
Insects described in 1985
Taxonomy articles created by Polbot